Nikolay or Nikolai Petrov may refer to:

 Nikolai Arnoldovich Petrov (1943–2011), Russian pianist
 Nikolay Filippovich Petrov (1872–1941), Russian painter
 Nikolai Pavlovich Petrov (1836–1920), Russian engineer
 Nikolai Petrovich Petrov (1834–1876), Russian painter
 Nikolai Vasilevich Petrov (1890–1964), theatre director
 Nikolai Vladimirovich Petrov, political scientist
 Nikolay Petrov (footballer) (born 1988), Bulgarian football player
 Nikolay Petrov (ice hockey) (born 1956), Bulgarian ice hockey player
 Nikolai Petrov (academician) (1840–1921), Russian theologist and philologist, Ukrainian academician

See also
 Nikola Petrov (disambiguation)